Cyrtomium falcatum is a species of fern, commonly known as house holly-fern and Japanese holly fern, in the wood fern family Dryopteridaceae. It is native to eastern Asia.

It grows from crevices in coastal cliffs, stream banks, rocky slopes, and other moist, stable areas.

Description
This fern is a perennial plant with a large light brown rhizome.

Cyrtomium falcatum has leaves exceeding  in length made up of  six to ten pairs of shiny bright green leaflets. Each leathery leaflet has a flat to wavy to slightly toothed margin and a netlike pattern of veining. The underside of each leaflet has sori beneath brown or black indusia.

Cultivation
Cyrtomium falcatum is a popular ornamental plant in temperate climate gardens (zones 7 to 10), and is also popular as a house plant. It is hardier than most ferns; it thrives in light shade to deep shade with average fern soil. It is easily and quickly propagated by spores, but it can also be propagated via rhizome division.

This plant has gained the Royal Horticultural Society's Award of Garden Merit.

The fern has escaped from cultivation on other continents and has become established in the wild as an introduced species. It can now be found in much of Europe, North America, the Atlantic Islands, Australia, New Zealand, and South America.

References

External links

USDA Plants Profile - Cyrtomium falcatum
Jepson Manual Treatment
Flora of North America Profile

Dryopteridaceae
Ferns of Asia
Flora of Japan
Flora of China
Flora of Korea
Garden plants of Asia
House plants